The 2015 Armed Forces Bowl was an American college football bowl game that was played on January 2, 2015, at Amon G. Carter Stadium on the campus of Texas Christian University in Fort Worth, Texas.  The twelfth annual Armed Forces Bowl, it matched the Houston Cougars of the American Athletic Conference against the Pittsburgh Panthers of the Atlantic Coast Conference. The game began at 11:00 a.m. CST and aired on ESPN. It was one of the 2014–15 bowl games that concluded the 2014 FBS football season.

The bowl was the first to be sponsored by aerospace and defense company Lockheed Martin (which has two of its divisions headquartered in the DFW area); as such, for sponsorship purposes the game was officially known as the Lockheed Martin Armed Forces Bowl.

With less than 11 minutes left on the game clock, Houston trailed Pittsburgh by 25 points, but the Cougars came back to win 35–34.  It was the biggest fourth quarter comeback in bowl history.

Teams
The game featured the Houston Cougars of the American Athletic Conference against the Pittsburgh Panthers of the Atlantic Coast Conference.

The 2015 Armed Forces Bowl was the third overall meeting between Houston and Pittsburgh, with the series tied 1–1 entering the game. The last time the two teams had met was in 1997.

Houston Cougars

After finishing their regular season with a 7–5 record, the Cougars accepted their invitation to play in the game.

The game was Houston's fourth Armed Forces Bowl, tying them with the Air Force Falcons for the most appearances in the game.  The Cougars were 1–2 in the game before 2015, having lost the 2005 Fort Worth Bowl to the Kansas Jayhawks by a score of 42–13, then having won the 2008 game over the 2008 Air Force Falcons by a score of 34–28, and finally having lost the 2009 game once again to Air Force by a score of 47–20.

Pittsburgh Panthers

After finishing their regular season with a 6–6 record, the Panthers accepted their invitation to play in the game.

The game was Pittsburgh's first Armed Forces Bowl.

Game summary

Scoring summary

Source:

Statistics

References

Armed Forces Bowl
Armed Forces Bowl
Houston Cougars football bowl games
Pittsburgh Panthers football bowl games
Armed ForcesBowl
January 2015 sports events in the United States
2010s in Fort Worth, Texas